Government Christian Higher Secondary School, previously known as Mission High School, Rawalpindi is a government school located in Raja Bazaar, Rawalpindi, Pakistan. It is one of the oldest school in Rawalpindi.

History
It was founded in 1856 by Presbyterian Mission. Originally it was called Mission High School, and for the people it is still a missionary school. The school was affiliated with Calcutta University.

In 1893, it was given the status of a college. In 1902, the college was separated and named Gordon College.

Alumni
 Sikander Hayat Khan, Prime Minister of Punjab 
 Shaikh Din Muhammad, Governor of Sindh
 Feroz Khan Noon Prime Minister of Pakistan
 Sheikh Rashid Ahmed, Pakistani politician 
 Malik Shakeel Awan, Pakistani politician

References

Schools in Rawalpindi
Educational institutions established in 1856
1856 establishments in British India